Allan Park Aerodrome  is located  northeast of Allan Park, Ontario, Canada.

References

Registered aerodromes in Ontario